Mochary is a surname. Notable people with the surname include:

Mary V. Mochary (born 1942), American lawyer and politician
Matthew Mochary (born 1968), American businessman, investor, and filmmaker

See also
Moczary, Bieszczady County